Sophie Hannah (born 1971) is a British poet and novelist. From 1997 to 1999 she was Fellow Commoner in Creative Arts at Trinity College, Cambridge, and between 1999 and 2001 a junior research fellow of Wolfson College, Oxford.  She lives with her husband and two children in Cambridge.

Biography
Sophie Hannah was born in Manchester, England; her father was the academic Norman Geras and her mother is the author Adèle Geras. She attended Beaver Road Primary School in Didsbury and the University of Manchester.

Publications 
Hannah published her first book of poems, The Hero and the Girl Next Door, at the age of 24. Her style is often compared to the light verse of Wendy Cope and the surrealism of Lewis Carroll. Her poems' subjects tend toward the personal, utilizing classic rhyme schemes with understated wit, humour, and warmth. She has published five previous collections of poetry with Carcanet Press. In 2004, she was named one of the Poetry Book Society's Next Generation poets. Her poems are studied at GCSE (including "Rubbish at Adultery" and "Your Dad Did What?"), A-level, and degree level across the UK.

While Hannah has written a book for children, she is better known for her psychological crime novels. Her first novel, Little Face, was published in 2006 and has sold more than 100,000 copies. Her fifth crime novel, Lasting Damage, was published in the UK on 17 February 2011. Kind of Cruel, her seventh psychological thriller to feature the characters Simon Waterhouse and Charlie Zailer, was published in 2012.

Her 2008 novel, The Point of Rescue, was produced for TV as the two-part drama Case Sensitive and shown on 2 and 3 May 2011 on the UK's ITV network. It stars Olivia Williams in the lead role of DS Charlie Zailer and Darren Boyd as DC Simon Waterhouse. Its first showing had  5.4 million viewers. A second two-part story based on  The Other Half Lives was shown on 12 and 13 July 2012.

In addition to works entirely of her own devising, Hannah has written a series of novels based on Agatha Christie's Hercule Poirot. Hannah has referred to such works as "continuation novels," a subgenre of the crime novel. She has elaborated on the subgenre while reviewing examples by Ngaio Marsh/Stella Duffy and Dorothy L. Sayers/Jill Paton Walsh.

Hannah has translated three children's picture books from Swedish as well as writing a work of social psychology entitled How to Hold a Grudge: from resentment to contentment: the power of grudges to transform your life.

Other professional activities 
Hannah participated in the creation of a master's degree in Crime and Thriller Writing at the University of Cambridge, for which she is the main teacher and course director.

Works

For young children

 Carrot the Goldfish, illustrated by Jean Baylis (Hamish Hamilton, 1992)
 The Box Room: poems for children (Orchard Books, 2001)

Translations
The Swedish-language Moomin picture books were written and illustrated by Tove Jansson.
 The Book about Moomin, Mymble and Little My [1952] (Sort of Books, 2001) – new verse translation
 Who Will Comfort Toffle? [1960] (Sort of, 2003) – new verse translation
 The Dangerous Journey [1977] (Sort of, 2010) – "new verse translation of the third rhyming tale from Moomin Valley"

Poetry

 Early Bird Blues (1993) – limited edition pamphlet
 Second Helping of Your Heart (1994) – limited edition pamphlet
 The Hero and the Girl Next Door (Carcanet Press,1995)
 Hotels Like Houses, (Carcanet, 1996)
 Leaving and Leaving You, (Carcanet, 1999)
 Love Me Slender: Poems About Love (2000)
 First of the Last Chances, (Carcanet, 2003)
 Selected Poems, 2006
 Pessimism for Beginners, (Carcanet, 2007)
 Marrying the Ugly Millionaire: New and Collected Poems, (Carcanet, 2015)
 Postcard from a Travel Snob

Fiction 

Gripless (1999)
Cordial and Corrosive: An Unfairy Tale (2000)
The Superpower of Love (2002)

The Waterhouse and Zailer series 
 Little Face (Hodder & Stoughton, 2006) 
 Hurting Distance (Hodder, 2007); also published as The Truth-Teller's Lie (2010)
 The Point of Rescue (Hodder, 2008); also as The Wrong Mother (2009) (adapted for the TV Series Case Sensitive starring Olivia Williams and Darren Boyd)
 The Other Half Lives (Hodder, 2009) also as The Dead Lie Down (2009) (adapted for the TV Series Case Sensitive starring Olivia Williams and Darren Boyd)
 A Room Swept White (Hodder, 2010) also as The Cradle in the Grave (2011)
 Lasting Damage (Hodder, 2011) also as The Other Woman's House (2012)
 Kind of Cruel (Hodder, 2012)
 The Carrier (Hodder, 2013)
 The Telling Error (Hodder, 2014) also as Woman with a Secret (2015)
 Pictures Or It Didn’t Happen (Hodder, 2015) also as The Warning: A Short Story (2015)
 The Narrow Bed (Hodder, 2016) also as The Next to Die (2019)
 The Couple at the Table (Hodder, 2022)

Hercule Poirot 
The Monogram Murders (2014)
Closed Casket (2016)
The Mystery of Three Quarters (2018)
The Killings at Kingfisher Hill (2020)
Hercule Poirot's Silent Night (2023)

Short story collections 
The Fantastic Book of Everybody's Secrets (2008)
Something Untoward: Six Tales of Domestic Terror (2012)
The Visitors Book (2015)

Novels 
The Orphan Choir (Hammer, 2013)
A Game for All the Family (Hodder & Stoughton, 2015)
Did You See Melody? (Hodder & Stoughton, 2017) also as Keep Her Safe (2017)
Haven't They Grown (Hodder & Stoughton, 2019) also known as Perfect Little Children (2019)

Non-fiction 
How to Hold a Grudge (Hodder & Stoughton, 2018)
Happiness, a Mystery: And 66 Attempts to Solve It (Wellcome Collection, 2020)

References

External links
 
 
Radio interview (2009)
 crimezone.nl; Sophie Hannah at Crimezone (hebban.nl)
 
 Archival material at 

1971 births
Alumni of the University of Manchester
English children's writers
English Jews
English translators
English women poets
Fellows of Wolfson College, Oxford
Jewish poets
Living people
Members of the Detection Club
Swedish–English translators
Women mystery writers
Writers from Manchester